Two leadership elections were held in the Ulster Unionist Party in 1995:

March 1995 Ulster Unionist Party leadership election
September 1995 Ulster Unionist Party leadership election